EN-V can refer to:

 The LG enV (VX9900) cell phone
 The General Motors EN-V autonomous electronic car prototype.